Akimsola Boussari (born 10 March 1988 in Sansanné-Mango) is a Togolese football footballer who currently plays for Warri Wolves F.C.

Career 
Boussari began his career with Doumbé FC and joined in summer 2005 to AS Douanes. On 1 July 2009 left AS Douanes and joined to Nigerian based club Enugu Rangers, after one month went on loan to Difaa El Jadida before returning to his club Enugu Rangers.

International career 
He was first called for Togo national football team on 10 June 2009 and played his first game on 20 June 2009 against Morocco.

References

External links 

1988 births
Living people
Togolese footballers
Togo international footballers
Expatriate footballers in Nigeria
Rangers International F.C. players
Expatriate footballers in Morocco
AS Douanes (Togo) players
Difaâ Hassani El Jadidi players
People from Mango, Togo
Association football defenders
Doumbé FC players
21st-century Togolese people